ISO 15919 (Transliteration of Devanagari and related Indic scripts into Latin characters) is one of a series of international standards for romanization by the International Organization for Standardization. It was published in 2001 and uses diacritics to map the much larger set of consonants and vowels in Brahmic and Nastaliq scripts to the Latin script.

Overview

Relation to other systems 

ISO 15919 is an international standard on the romanization of many Brahmic scripts, which was agreed upon in 2001 by a network of the national standards institutes of 157 countries. However, the Hunterian transliteration system is the "national system of romanization in India" and a United Nations expert group noted about ISO 15919 that "there is no evidence of the use of the system either in India or in international cartographic products."

Another standard, United Nations Romanization Systems for Geographical Names (UNRSGN), was developed by the United Nations Group of Experts on Geographical Names (UNGEGN) and covers many Brahmic scripts.

The ALA-LC romanization was approved by the Library of Congress and the American Library Association and is a US standard. The International Alphabet of Sanskrit Transliteration (IAST) is not a standard (as no specification exists for it) but a convention developed in Europe for the transliteration of Sanskrit rather than the transcription of Brahmic scripts.

As a notable difference, both international standards, ISO 15919 and UNRSGN transliterate anusvara as ṁ, while ALA-LC and IAST use ṃ for it. However, ISO 15919 provides guidance towards disambiguating between various anusvara situations (such as labial versus dental nasalizations), which is described in the table below.

Comparison with UNRSGN and IAST 

The table below shows the differences between ISO 15919, UNRSGN and IAST for Devanagari transliteration.

Font support 

Only certain fonts support all Latin Unicode characters for the transliteration of Indic scripts according to this standard. For example, Tahoma supports almost all the characters needed. Arial and Times New Roman font packages that come with Microsoft Office 2007 and later also support most Latin Extended Additional characters like ḑ, ḥ, ḷ, ḻ, ṁ, ṅ, ṇ, ṛ, ṣ and ṭ.

There is no standard keyboard layout for ISO 15919 input but many systems provide a way to select Unicode characters visually. ISO/IEC 14755 refers to this as a screen-selection entry method.

See also
National Library at Kolkata romanisation
International Alphabet of Sanskrit Transliteration (IAST)

References

External links
ISO 15919:2001
Transliteration of Indic scripts: how to use ISO 15919 (archived 18 April 2016)
Unicode.org CLDR chart of Latin-Indic transliteration
Aksharamukha Asian Script Converter Transliterates between about 20 Asian scripts and several romanization standards including ISO 15919
Any indic language to another indic language Transliteration – SILPA project (archived 22 February 2010)
Indian Languages Transliteration – Basic Transliteration for users and programmers.
Transliteration standard for Hindi, Marathi & Nepali
iso15919.py – An implementation of the Devanāgarī part of ISO 15919 in Python (archived 23 January 2010)
Devanagari, Sinhala, Tamil and ISO 15919 transliteration service (archived 29 July 2010)
Devanāgarī to ISO 15919 (IAST) converter Online tool for converting Devanagari to IAST (archived 15 July 2011)

Romanization of Brahmic
15919
15919